Western Desert may refer to:

 Western Desert (Egypt), part of the Sahara Desert west of the River Nile
 Western Desert (Iraq), part of the Syrian Desert
 Westerb Desert Art Movement, an Aboriginal Australian art movement originating with Papunya Tula
 Western Desert cultural bloc, a cultural region in Australia
 Western Desert language, a cluster of Aboriginal Australian languages

See also
 Western Desert Campaign of the Second World War
 Western Desert Force, World War II